The men's snowboard halfpipe competition at the 2017 Asian Winter Games in Sapporo, Japan was held on 25 February at the Bankei Ski Area.

Schedule
All times are Japan Standard Time (UTC+09:00)

Results

Qualification

Final

References 

Final

External links
FIS website

Men